Narejani is a village and deh in Hyderabad taluka of Hyderabad District, Sindh. As of 2017, it has a population of 17,270, in 3,408 households. It is part of the tapedar circle of Tando Haider.

References 

Populated places in Hyderabad District, Pakistan